The Embassy of Germany in Dhaka is the diplomatic mission of Germany in Bangladesh.

The embassy is located at Madani Avenue, in Dhaka.

Ambassadors

References

External links 

 
 German Foreign Office

 
Bangladesh
Germany
Buildings and structures in Dhaka
Bangladesh–Germany relations
Germany